The 1999–2000 season was the second season in the history of Northern Spirit (now North West Sydney Spirit). It was also the second season in the National Soccer League where they finished 13th.

Players

Transfers

Transfers in

Transfers out

Competitions

Overview

National Soccer League

League table

Results summary

Results by round

Matches

Statistics

Appearances and goals
Players with no appearances not included in the list.

Clean sheets

References

North West Sydney Spirit FC seasons